
Gmina Mietków is a rural gmina (administrative district) in Wrocław County, Lower Silesian Voivodeship, in south-western Poland.

Neighbouring gminas
Gmina Mietków is bordered by the gminas of Kąty Wrocławskie, Kostomłoty, Marcinowice, Sobótka and Żarów.

Villages
The gmina contains the villages of Borzygniew, Chwałów, Domanice, Dzikowa, Maniów, Maniów Mały, Maniów Wielki, Mietków, Milin, Piława, Proszkowice, Stróża, Ujów and Wawrzeńczyce.

References

Mietkow
Wrocław County